Let's Touch the Sky is the 11th studio album (12th overall) of the jazz group Fourplay, released in 2010. It is the first Fourplay album with Chuck Loeb, who replaced Larry Carlton on the guitar.

Track listing

Personnel 

Fourplay
 Bob James – keyboards
 Chuck Loeb – guitars
 Nathan East – bass guitar, vocals (5)
 Harvey Mason – drums, percussion

Additional Personnel
 Ruben Studdard – vocals (8)
 Anita Baker – vocals (11)
 Heather Mason – backing vocals

Production 
 Fourplay – producers (1-7, 9-12)
 Harvey Mason, Jr. – producer (8)
 Mark Wexler – executive producer
 Ken Freeman – engineer (1-7, 9-12), mixing 
 Andrew Hey – engineer (8)
 Joshua Blanchard – assistant engineer 
 Paul Blackmore – mastering
 Debbie Johnson – production coordinator
 Amy McGuire Lynch – production coordinator
 Marion Orr – production coordinator
 Natalie Singer – product manager 
 Jennifer Armstrong – photography
 Sandrine Lee – photography 
 Cassie O'Sullivan – stylist, makeup 
 Sonny Abelardo – management

Reception 
 Soultracks: Highly recommended

References 

Fourplay albums
2010 albums
Heads Up International albums